Kyiv Oblast is subdivided into districts (raions) which are subdivided into territorial communities (hromadas).

Current

On 18 July 2020, the number of districts was reduced to seven. These are:

 Bila Tserkva (Білоцерківський район), the center is in the town of Bila Tserkva;
 Boryspil (Бориспільський район), the center is in the town of Boryspil;
 Brovary (Броварський район), the center is in the town of Brovary;
 Bucha (Бучанський район), the center is in the town of Bucha;
 Fastiv (Фастівський район), the center is in the town of Fastiv;
 Obukhiv (Обухівський район), the center is in the town of Obukhiv;
 Vyshhorod (Вишгородський район), the center is in the town of Vyshhorod.

Administrative divisions until 2020

Before July 2020, Kyiv Oblast was subdivided into 38 regions: 25 districts (raions) and 13 city municipalities (mis'krada or misto), officially known as territories governed by city councils.
Cities under the oblast's jurisdiction:
Berezan (Березань)
Bila Tserkva (Біла Церква)
Boryspil (Бориспіль)
Brovary (Бровари)
Bucha (Буча)
Fastiv (Фастів)
Irpin Municipality
Cities and towns under the city's jurisdiction:
Irpin (Ірпінь)
Urban-type settlements under the district's jurisdiction:
Hostomel (Гостомель)
Kotsiubynske (Коцюбинське)
Vorzel (Ворзель)
Obukhiv Municipality
Cities and towns under the city's jurisdiction:
Obukhiv (Обухів)
Pereiaslav (Переяслав), formerly Pereiaslav-Khmelnytskyi
Pripyat (Прип'ять)
Rzhyshchiv (Ржищів)
Slavutych (Славутич)
Vasylkiv (Васильків)
Districts (raions):
Baryshivka (Баришівський район)
Urban-type settlements under the district's jurisdiction:
Baryshivka (Баришівка)
Bila Tserkva (Білоцерківський район)
Cities and towns under the district's jurisdiction:
Uzyn (Узин)
Urban-type settlements under the district's jurisdiction:
Terezyne (Терезине)
Bohuslav (Богуславський район)
Cities and towns under the district's jurisdiction:
Bohuslav (Богуслав)
Borodianka (Бородянський район)
Urban-type settlements under the district's jurisdiction:
Babyntsi (Бабинці)
Borodianka (Бородянка)
Klavdiievo-Tarasove (Клавдієво-Тарасове)
Nemishaieve (Немішаєве)
Piskivka (Пісківка)
Boryspil (Бориспільський район)
Brovary (Броварський район)
Urban-type settlements under the district's jurisdiction:
Kalynivka (Калинівка)
Kalyta (Калита)
Velyka Dymerka (Велика Димерка)
Fastiv (Фастівський район)
Urban-type settlements under the district's jurisdiction:
Borova (Борова)
Kozhanka (Кожанка)
Ivankiv (Іванківський район)
Cities and towns under the district's jurisdiction:
Chernobyl (Чорнобиль)
Urban-type settlements under the district's jurisdiction:
Ivankiv (Іванків)
Kaharlyk (Кагарлицький район)
Cities and towns under the district's jurisdiction:
Kaharlyk (Кагарлик)
Kyiv-Sviatoshyn (Києво-Святошинський район)
Cities and towns under the district's jurisdiction:
Boiarka (Боярка)
Vyshneve (Вишневе)
Urban-type settlements under the district's jurisdiction:
Chabany (Чабани)
Makariv (Макарівський район)
Urban-type settlements under the district's jurisdiction:
Kodra (Кодра)
Makariv (Макарів)
Myronivka (Миронівський район)
Cities and towns under the district's jurisdiction:
Myronivka (Миронівка)
Obukhiv (Обухівський район)
Cities and towns under the district's jurisdiction:
Ukrainka (Українка)
Urban-type settlements under the district's jurisdiction:
Kozyn (Козин)
Pereiaslav-Khmelnytskyi (Переяслав-Хмельницький район)
Poliske (Поліський район)
Urban-type settlements under the district's jurisdiction:
Krasiatychi (Красятичі)
Rokytne (Рокитнянський район)
Urban-type settlements under the district's jurisdiction:
Rokytne (Рокитне)
Skvyra (Сквирський район)
Cities and towns under the district's jurisdiction:
Skvyra (Сквира)
Stavyshche (Ставищенський район)
Urban-type settlements under the district's jurisdiction:
Stavyshche (Ставище)
Tarashcha (Таращанський район)
Cities and towns under the district's jurisdiction:
Tarashcha (Тараща)
Tetiiv (Тетіївський район)
Cities and towns under the district's jurisdiction:
Tetiiv (Тетіїв)
Vasylkiv (Васильківський район)
Urban-type settlements under the district's jurisdiction:
Doslidnytske (Дослідницьке)
Hlevakha (Глеваха)
Hrebinky (Гребінки)
Kalynivka (Калинівка)
Volodarka (Володарський район)
Urban-type settlements under the district's jurisdiction:
Volodarka (Володарка)
Vyshhorod (Вишгородський район)
Cities and towns under the district's jurisdiction:
Vyshhorod (Вишгород)
Urban-type settlements under the district's jurisdiction:
Dymer (Димер)
Yahotyn (Яготинський район)
Cities and towns under the district's jurisdiction:
Yahotyn (Яготин)
Zghurivka (Згурівський район)
Urban-type settlements under the district's jurisdiction:
Zghurivka (Згурівка)

References

Kyiv
Kyiv Oblast